The 1983–84 Serie A season was won by Juventus. It was a tight championship, with reigning champions Roma providing strong opposition to the Bianconeri, who obtained the point they needed by drawing 1-1 against Avellino on 6 May, taking the title with one match to spare.

Teams
Milan, Lazio and Catania had been promoted from Serie B.

Final classification

Results

Top goalscorers

References and sources

Almanacco Illustrato del Calcio - La Storia 1898-2004, Panini Edizioni, Modena, September 2005

External links

 :it:Classifica calcio Serie A italiana 1984 - Italian version with pictures and info.
  - All results on RSSSF Website.

Serie A seasons
Italy
1983–84 in Italian football leagues